York Lions Stadium is an outdoor sports stadium on the Keele Campus of Toronto's York University in the former city of North York. It is home to the York Lions, the varsity teams of York University, the Toronto Arrows of Major League Rugby and York United of the Canadian Premier League. The facility was primarily built for the 2015 Pan American and Parapan American Games, where it hosted track and field events and the opening ceremony. In 2021, the stadium's running track was removed to expand the playing surface used for football and soccer.

History

Initial plans had a multi-purpose athletics and soccer stadium to be built somewhere in the vicinity of Hamilton, Ontario; however, the final plans separated the soccer and athletics venues. The soccer stadium, Tim Hortons Field, was built on the site of Ivor Wynne Stadium, while the athletics stadium was built at York University. During the games the venue was known as the CIBC Pan Am and Parapan Am Athletics Stadium.

The stadium was expected to seat approximately 5,000 spectators – 3,000 permanent and 2,000 temporary. During the games an additional 7,500 temporary seats were added, bringing total capacity to 12,500. The facility cost roughly $45.5 million, with $34.9 million attributed to the design and construction with the rest for running costs.

On May 26, 2016, it was announced that the stadium would play host to the 2017 North American Indigenous Games.  The stadium will be the site of the opening and closing ceremonies as well as the athletics competitions in July 2017. In the same year, the stadium was also used as an event facility for the Invictus Games.

In early 2021, the stadium's track and grass field was replaced with a larger FIFA and World Rugby certified artificial turf surface. The renovations also allow for the playing surface to be covered with an air-supported dome during winter months.

Professional sports
The Toronto Arrows, a professional rugby union club which joined Major League Rugby in 2019, played exhibition games in 2018 at York Lions Stadium. However, during its inaugural 2019 MLR season the team split its home games between Alumni Field and Lamport Stadium.  They began hosting their games at York Lions Stadium in 2022.

York United FC, a soccer team in the Canadian Premier League, has played their home games at York Lions Stadium since their inaugural season in 2019.

Toronto FC II, a soccer team in MLS Next Pro, began playing their home games at York Lions Stadium in 2022.

Major competitions hosted

Gallery

See also
 List of Canadian Premier League stadiums
 Venues of the 2015 Pan American and Parapan American Games
 Birchmount Stadium – City of Toronto / Toronto District School Board
 Centennial Park Stadium – City of Toronto
 Esther Shiner Stadium – City of Toronto
 Lamport Stadium – City of Toronto
 Monarch Park Stadium – Toronto District School Board
 Metro Toronto Track and Field Centre – City of Toronto
 Rosedale Field – City of Toronto
 Varsity Stadium – University of Toronto

References

External links

 York University Lions Page
 Toronto 2015 - CIBC Pan Am/Parapan Am Athletics Stadium Page

Soccer venues in Ontario
Sports venues in Toronto
North York
Venues of the 2015 Pan American Games
York University buildings
Major League Rugby stadiums
Venues of the 2015 Parapan American Games
University sports venues in Canada
Toronto Arrows stadiums
Toronto FC II
Pan American Games athletics venues
2015 establishments in Ontario
Sports venues completed in 2015
York United FC
Canadian Premier League stadiums
Public–private partnership projects in Canada